Styr Nyxas (or Styr Nykhas) is a political ideology advocating for the reunification of the Ossetians within the Russian Federation. The Ossetians are an Iranic ethnic group indigenous to Ossetia, a region that spans the Caucasus Mountains. They are currently administratively divided into the Republic of North Ossetia–Alania (a federal subject of the Russian Federation) and the de facto independent republic of South Ossetia.

See also
Ossetians
North Ossetia
South Ossetia
Georgian–Ossetian conflict (1918–1920)

References

Ossetian people